The Nigerian Tribune is an English-language newspaper published in Ibadan, Nigeria. It was established in 1949 by Obafemi Awolowo and is the oldest running private Nigerian newspaper.

In the colonial era, the newspaper served as the mouthpiece for Awolowo's populist welfare programmes. It also played an important role in defending the interests of the Yoruba people in a period when different ethnic groups were struggling for ascendancy.
After independence in the 1960s most publications were government-owned until the 1990s, but private papers such as the Nigerian Tribune, The Punch, Vanguard and the Guardian continued to expose public and private scandals despite government attempts at suppression.
General Ibrahim Babangida stated that out of all the Nigerian newspapers, he would only read and take seriously the Nigerian Tribune's editorial column.

The book Leadership Failure and Nigeria's Fading Hopes by Femi Okurounmu consists of excerpts from a weekly column in the Nigerian Tribune published between 2004 and 2009.
The author, a patriotic Nigerian elder statesman, laments how the corruption and the selfishness of successive leaders has destroyed the hopes not just of Nigerians, but of the entire black race.

The managing director and editor-in-chief of Nigerian Tribune, Segun Olatunji, resigned in December 2008 in the wake of a series of staff changes, and a few days later, the editor, Rauf Abiodun, also resigned in the wake of a series of staff changes. Sam Adesua has been appointed as the new managing director/editor-in-chief of the Nigerian Tribune by Mrs. HID Awolowo, the chairman of the publisher African Newspapers of Nigeria Ltd, which owns the Nigerian Tribune. There was a change in the editorship of the daily newspaper when Edward Dickson was appointed. The changes were said to be part of a move to modernize the paper and expand beyond narrow Yoruba partisan politics in the face of competition from The Westerner, The Nation and Nigerian Compass.

In September 2012, the newspaper's board of directors appointed Edward Dickson as managing director, Editor-in-Chief; Debo Abdulai as Editor Nigerian Tribune; Sina Oladeinde, Editor Sunday Tribune and Lasisi Olagunju as Saturday Tribune Editor.

African newspapers of Nigeria PLC is the publisher of Nigerian Tribune with Tribune online as its online edition.

References

Daily newspapers published in Nigeria
Newspapers established in 1949
Mass media in Ibadan
1949 establishments in Nigeria